Theodorus ("Theo") Johannes Meijer (born February 18, 1965 in Amersfoort, Utrecht) is a retired judoka from the Netherlands, who represented his native country at two consecutive Summer Olympics (1988 and 1992). He won the bronze medal in the men's half-heavyweight division (– 95 kg) in Barcelona, Spain (1992), alongside Dmitri Sergeyev who represented the Unified Team.

References

External links
 
 Dutch Olympic Committee 

1965 births
Living people
Dutch male judoka
Judoka at the 1988 Summer Olympics
Judoka at the 1992 Summer Olympics
Olympic judoka of the Netherlands
Olympic bronze medalists for the Netherlands
Olympic medalists in judo
Sportspeople from Amersfoort
Medalists at the 1992 Summer Olympics
20th-century Dutch people
21st-century Dutch people